Pyrausta antisocialis is a moth in the family Crambidae. It was described by Eugene G. Munroe in 1976. It is found in North America, where it has been recorded from New Mexico and Arizona.

Adults are on wing from June to August.

References

Moths described in 1976
antisocialis
Moths of North America